Germania is a district of the Siquirres canton, in the Limón province of Costa Rica.

History 
Germania was created on 19 September 1911 by Ley 11.

Geography 
Germania has an area of  km² and an elevation of  metres.

Locations
 Neighborhoods (Barrios): América, Babilonia
 Villages (Poblados): Cacao, Colombiana, Herediana, Milano, Trinidad, Williamsburg

Demographics 

For the 2011 census, Germania had a population of  inhabitants.

Transportation

Road transportation 
The district is covered by the following road routes:
 National Route 32
 National Route 415
 National Route 812

References 

Districts of Limón Province
Populated places in Limón Province